The Wonder Wheel is a  eccentric Ferris wheel at Deno's Wonder Wheel Amusement Park at Coney Island in the New York City borough of Brooklyn. The wheel is located on a plot bounded by West 12th Street to the west, Bowery Street to the north, Luna Park to the east, and the Riegelmann Boardwalk to the south. As with other eccentric Ferris wheels, some of the Wonder Wheel's passenger cabins are not fixed directly to the rim of the wheel, but instead slide along winding sets of rails between the hub and the rim.

Built in 1920 as one of several Ferris wheels on Coney Island, the Wonder Wheel was designed by Charles Hermann and operated by Herman J. Garms Sr. for six decades. Despite the subsequent economic decline of Coney Island, the Wonder Wheel continued to operate each summer through the 20th century. In 1983, Herman Garms's son Fred sold the ride to the Vourderis family, who restored the attraction and continue to run the wheel . The New York City Landmarks Preservation Commission designated the Wonder Wheel as an official New York City landmark in 1989, and minor modifications were subsequently made to the attraction.

History 
At the time of the Wonder Wheel's construction, Coney Island was one of the largest amusement areas in the United States. The first Ferris wheel in Coney Island was built for nearby Steeplechase Park in 1894 and was erroneously billed as "the world's largest". Several variations of the Ferris wheel were erected in the neighborhood in the 1900s and 1910s. The Wonder Wheel was unusual in that only one-third of its 24 cars were stationary, while the other two-thirds rolled on tracks within the wheel itself.

Garms ownership 

The Wonder Wheel was designed by Charles Hermann as an improvement on G.W.G. Ferris's giant wheel, and it was built for Herman J. Garms Sr. between 1918 and 1920 by the Eccentric Ferris Wheel Company. Coney Island landowner William J. Ward provided the land for the Wonder Wheel's construction. Garms, who had no formal financial experience, sold stock to family, other Coney Island business holders, and steelworkers. Meanwhile, Hermann sold all his shares in the wheel to raise money for construction and operation.

The wheel was opened on Memorial Day in 1920. Hermann originally called it the "Dip-the-Dip", promising to combine in his new invention "the thrill of a scenic railway, the fun of a Ferris wheel, and the excitement of the Chute-the-Chutes". According to a Science and Invention article, the Wonder Wheel provided a "real thrill like you have probably never had before—at least not at this great height." The wheel was later known as the "Eccentric Ferris Wheel" before being renamed the Wonder Wheel by 1940. To help with the Wonder Wheel's upkeep, the Garms family lived under the Wonder Wheel during the summers.

By the 1960s, Herman Garms's son Alfred "Fred" Garms took over operation of the Wonder Wheel. Coney Island started to decline during the mid-20th century, and by 1964, it had seen its lowest number of visitors in 25 years. Despite subsequent failed attempts to redevelop the area as a casino area or theme park, the Wonder Wheel continued to operate. Furthermore, it had not had any significant incidents in its history, making it a relatively well-off ride when other Coney Island attractions were closing. To prevent against crime, the wheel and surrounding attractions were protected by two German Shepherds at night: one at the wheel's base and the other on an adjacent roof; during the day, the dogs rode around in one of the Wonder Wheel's cars, where the operator provided food and water for them. Off-duty security officers were also hired to avoid conflicts with the mafia.

Vourderis ownership 

Fred Garms was looking to sell the wheel by 1983, as he was getting older and unable to manage the wheel. At the time, Deno D. Vourderis had been interested in buying the wheel whenever Garms was willing to sell. At the time, Vourderis was in a hospital recovering from a stabbing attack, but Garms approached Deno's son Dennis on the possibility of purchasing the ride. On June 7, 1983, Vourderis bought the Wonder Wheel from Garms and his cousin Walter Kerner Sr., and it became "Deno's Wonder Wheel". According to The New York Times, the only maintenance instructions given to the Vourderis family were the words "Good Luck" scribbled on a cardboard cigarette box. The Vourderis family restored the Wonder Wheel and made it the central attraction of Deno's Wonder Wheel Amusement Park. They spent $250,000 to restore the wheel, in addition to the $250,000 cost of buying it. Vourderis stated that part of the wheel's allure had come from when he had proposed to his future wife Lula atop the wheel 36 years prior to the purchase: he had promised to give the wheel to his wife as a future gift.

In 1989, the Wonder Wheel was made a New York City designated landmark by the New York City Landmarks Preservation Commission. By the early 1990s, the Wonder Wheel had offered free advertising space to the McDonald's fast-food chain, which had two franchises near the wheel. Fearing that the distinctive McDonald's logo would overshadow the Wonder Wheel itself, the Landmarks Preservation Commission voted against allowing a McDonald's logo on the wheel, despite allowing Vourderis to put "Deno's" above the "Wonder Wheel" sign on the wheel's hub. Upon Deno's death in the mid-1990s, control of the wheel and the amusement park passed to Dennis Vourderis. In the 2000s, Deno's grandchildren also became involved in the operation of the wheel. Despite the redevelopment of Coney Island and the erection of the nearby Luna Park in 2010, the wheel and associated amusement park continued to operate. The Wonder Wheel received a new solar-powered lighting system in 2012, replacing a lighting system that had been broken for three decades. Even during the aftermath of 2012's Hurricane Sandy, when Deno's Amusement Park was flooded, the Wonder Wheel was only slightly damaged and reopened the next year.

, the Wonder Wheel is the oldest continuous operating ride at Coney Island, and Dennis Vourderis and his brother Steve continue to operate the Wonder Wheel and the amusement park. Deno's Wonder Wheel Amusement Park is the last family-operated amusement park in Coney Island, and even though several developers have made offers for the amusement park and wheel, the Vourderis family has refused to sell. The Vourderis family had planned to celebrate the Wonder Wheel's centenary with a three-day celebration in May 2020, but this was postponed due to the COVID-19 pandemic in New York City, which shuttered all businesses deemed non-essential. The 2020 season was the first in which the Wonder Wheel did not operate at all; the Wonder Wheel ultimately reopened in April 2021. The centennial celebration was pushed back to sometime after the 2021 reopening.

Description

Design 

The Wonder Wheel is located at 3059 West 12th Street, just north of the Riegelmann Boardwalk. Its entrance plaza is composed of a steel structure with plywood-and-corrugated metal. The hub of the wheel, supported by two blue-painted legs shaped like the letter "A", contains an illuminated sign with orange letters spelling "" in all capital letters. There are sixteen spokes extending from the hub, each connected at their outer ends by a hexadecagonal frame and braced by green beams, each connected through rivets and gusset plates. The eight stationary cars on the hexadecagonal frame are painted white while the sixteen motion-capable cars are painted red-and-yellow or blue-and-yellow. Yet another Wonder Wheel sign with arrows is located on a southern approach to the wheel.

It has 24 fully enclosed passenger cars, each able to carry six people, giving a total capacity of 144 passengers. Sixteen of the cars slide inward on snaking tracks, falling outward as the wheel rotates. The remaining eight cars are fixed to the rim, giving a traditional Ferris wheel experience to passengers. Originally, the Wonder Wheel was located on two large blocks of concrete above a  pool of water.

Rides 
There is no height restriction for the Wonder Wheel. In 2015, a Newsday article estimated that 200,000 people ride the Wonder Wheel every year. , over 35 million rides have been taken on the wheel since it first opened. There are separate queues for the stationary and moving cars.

A ride on the Wonder Wheel costs 10 credits; the cost of each credit varies depending on how many are purchased, but generally cost $1 if purchased individually. Each ride consists of two rotations around the Wonder Wheel.

Safety 

The Wonder Wheel has had a strong safety record. The former owner-operator of the ride, Fred Garms, told the New York Daily News in 1981 that "I put my money into maintenance. [...] My father used to say, 'The dollar you don't put in today will cost you $2 tomorrow.'" News outlets reported in 2000 that the Wonder Wheel had not experienced any significant incidents in its history, operating every summer season since its opening; this remained true even after Hurricane Sandy flooded the surrounding amusement park in 2012. The wheel was also designed with an emergency hand crank in case of power losses.

The ride's first owner-operator, Herman Garms, overhauled and painted the ride each year, to protect it from the harsh weather associated with New York winters. The tradition of winter maintenance continued with the Wonder Wheel's subsequent owners. The only time the wheel stopped while not under the control of the operator was during the New York City blackout on July 13, 1977. The owners hand cranked the wheel around to evacuate the passengers.

Critical reception 
A writer for the St. Louis Post-Dispatch stated in 2000 that when "the cars begin to swing like a pendulum [...] you swear the entire structure is collapsing." The same year, a writer for the Central New Jersey Home News praised the views from the Wonder Wheel, saying that "a trip would not be complete without a spin on the Cyclone, a trip to the top of Deno's Wonder Wheel or a corn dog at Nathan's." In 2015, a Newsday reporter contrasted the two experiences of the Wonder Wheel's stationary and moving cars: the stationary-car experience was described as being "so pleasant a baby can ride it without alarm", but the swinging-car experience was "more like a catch-your-breath thrill".

Cultural influence 

The New York Times called the Wonder Wheel "the jewel of the showy, boomtown Coney Island that rose along the newly widened beach in the Roaring Twenties". The Wonder Wheel has inspired at least two replicas. Pixar Pal-A-Round, a  eccentric Ferris wheel at Disney California Adventure, opened in 2001 and was initially known as Sun Wheel and Mickey's Fun Wheel. There was also a replica in Yokohama Dreamland, Japan.

Due to its prominence on Coney Island, the Wonder Wheel has been depicted in numerous movies and TV shows, such as the film The Warriors, the film Remo Williams: The Adventure Begins, and the TV series Mr. Robot. At least one film is named after the attraction: Wonder Wheel (2017), set on Coney Island in the 1950s. In addition, the Wonder Wheel has been the setting for many engagements and weddings throughout its history. In August 2020, historian Charles Denson published a book about the Wonder Wheel, titled Coney Island’s Wonder Wheel Park.

See also 

 List of New York City Designated Landmarks in Brooklyn

References

Notes

Citations

External links 

 
 Oral histories about the Wonder Wheel collected by the Coney Island History Project

Ferris wheels in the United States
New York City Designated Landmarks in Brooklyn
Coney Island
1920 establishments in New York City